American country music duo the Judds recorded a total of 90 songs from 1978 to 2011. 80 of these songs were recorded as the Judds (77 studio recordings, two live recordings that were never recorded in the studio, and one studio work tape that was never completed for a studio album). "John Deere Tractor" was recorded twice. The first time was for Wynonna & Naomi (1984) and the second was for Love Can Build a Bridge (1990). The other ten songs consist of four demo recordings from 1978 which were recorded under the name Naomi & Christina, five songs from Wynonna's solo albums which feature vocals from Naomi, and one recording featuring guest backing vocals from the Judds.

Songs

References

Judds
 
The Judds